Darkness Foretold is the first EP by American death metal band Jungle Rot. It was released in 1998 on S.O.D. Records.

Track listing

References

Jungle Rot albums
1998 debut EPs